The Maban languages are a small family of languages which have been included in the proposed Nilo-Saharan family. Maban languages are spoken in eastern Chad, the Central African Republic and western Sudan (Darfur).

Languages
The Maban branch includes the following languages:

Mimi of Nachtigal
 Kenjeje (Yaali, Faranga)
 Masalit: Surbakhal, Masalit
 Aiki (Runga and Kibet, sometimes considered separate languages)
 Mabang: Karanga, Marfa, Maba

The languages attested in two word lists labelled "Mimi", collected by Decorse (Mimi-D) and Nachtigal (Mimi-N), have also been classified as Maban, though this has been contested. Mimi-N appears to have been remotely related to Maban proper, while Mimi-D appears to have not been Maban at all, with the similarities due to language contact with locally dominant Maba.

Blench (2021) gives the following classification:
Proto-Maban
? Mimi of Nachtigal
Aiki-Kibet
Aiki (= Runga)
Kibet
core branch
Kendeje
Masalit, Surbakhal
Maban (= Mabang)
Karanga
Marfa
Maba

External relationships
Based on morphological evidence such as tripartite number marking on nominals, Roger Blench (2021) suggests that closest relatives of the Maban languages may be the Eastern Sudanic languages, especially the Taman languages, which form a branch within Northern Eastern Sudanic. Maban also shares lexical similarities with the Fur languages, Saharan languages, and even Songhay languages, but generally has more lexical matches with Eastern Sudanic languages.

Comparative vocabulary
Blench (2021) posits the following consonants for proto-Maban:

Vowels likely were ATR pairs, with at least *a *ɛ *e *i *ɔ *o *u and possibly *ɪ *ʊ, plus length. 

There were likely two register tones plus the possibility of contour tones on long vowels. 

Sample basic vocabulary for Maban languages:

Numerals
Comparison of numerals in individual languages:

See also
Maban word lists (Wiktionary)

References 

Calvain Mbernodji, Katharina Wolf. 2008. Une enquête sociolinguistique des parlers Kibet, Rounga, Daggal et Mourro du Tchad. SIL International.

Further reading
Edgar, John T. 1991. Maba-group Lexicon. (Sprache und Oralität in Afrika: Frankfurter Studien zur Afrikanistik, 13.) Berlin: Dietrich Reimer.
Edgar, John. 1991. First Steps Towards Proto-Maba. African Languages and Cultures 4: 113-133.

External links
G. Starostin, 2011. On Mimi

 
Language families
Languages of Chad
Languages of South Sudan
Languages of Sudan